Samolus valerandi is a species of flowering plant in the primrose family Primulaceae. Common names include seaside brookweed, brookweed, thin-leaf brookweed, water cabbage, and water rose.

Description
It is a small perennial, growing to around 35 cm (13.8 inches) high. Its inflorescence is a raceme, with small white flowers on long stalks. Its corollas have five lobes. It can produce flowers throughout the growing season, from spring to fall. Its fruits are capsules that are green and globose.

Taxonomy
Although some floras recognize the North American populations of S. valerandi as a separate species (S. parviflorus) or subspecies (S. valerandi ssp. parviflorus), a 2012 investigation based on molecular and morphological data indicated that S. vagans and S. parviflorus should not be regarded as separate species but as part of a widespread "S. valerandi species complex".

Distribution
Samolus vaerandi is widely distributed across western and Mediterranean Europe, north Africa, Asia and Australia, Central and South America including Cuba, and Japan.

Ecological aspects
This species is found in a variety of wet habitats, including stream banks, tidal marshes, and seeps. It can be found in both degraded and intact natural communities.

Cultivation
The plant can be grown in ponds, bog gardens, and damp areas in the garden. S. valerandi prefers light (sandy), medium (loamy), and heavy (clay) soils, preferably neutral or basic (alkaline) soils. It cannot tolerate shade and likes a bright, sunny position. It requires moist or wet soil and can even grow in water. The plant can tolerate maritime exposure and is self-fertile. S. valerandi is sometimes grown in aquariums, although they seem to last only a limited time when grown fully submersed.

Uses
The plant's leaves, when cut and agitated in water, produce a lather, for which reason in Palestine it has been used by the local Arab population, in former times, to launder clothes and was called by them sabūn 'arab (= Arab soap).

References

External links
 Fora of North Central Texas
 Flora of Missouri - illustrated
 Illinois Wild Flowers

valerandi
Flora of Europe
Flora of Africa
Flora of Asia
Flora of South America
Flora of North America
Flora of Australia
Freshwater plants
Plants described in 1753
Taxa named by Carl Linnaeus
Saponaceous plants